Damaraland long-billed lark may refer to:

 Certhilauda benguelensis kaokoensis, a subspecies of the Benguela long-billed lark 
 Karoo long-billed lark, a species of lark